Tukayevo (Tuqay) is a rural locality (a village) in Chekmagushevsky District, Bashkortostan, Russia. The population was 80 as of 2010. There are 2 streets.

Geography 
Tukayevo is located 11 km west of Chekmagush (the district's administrative centre) by road. Nikolayevka is the nearest rural locality.

References 

Rural localities in Chekmagushevsky District